In 1858 the district courts were established with a civil jurisdiction up to 200 replacing the Court of Requests which only sat in limited places, and had a general claim limit of 10 to £30. Initially each judge was appointed to a specific district. From 1955 judges were appointed to all district courts.

Serious criminal matters that were not punishable by death were heard by the courts of quarter sessions. From 1858 each district court judge had a concurrent appointment as chairman of the courts of quarter sessions for the district to which they were appointed. In 1973 the separate district courts and courts of quarter sessions were replaced by a single District Court which exercised both criminal and civil jurisdiction throughout the state.

The position of Chairman of the District Court Judges was introduced in 1950 to exercise administrative functions in relation to the courts similar to role of the Chief Justice in the Supreme Court. The role was renamed Chief Judge with the restructure of the courts in 1973.

The Compensation Court of New South Wales was abolished on 1 January 2004 and the judges were transferred to the District Court, maintaining their seniority based on the date of their appointment to the Compensation Court.

In 1918 the Judges Retirement Act 1918 (NSW), operated to retrospectively impose a retirement age of 70 immediately affecting Charles Heydon, Ernest Docker and Grantley Fitzhardinge and subsequently other judges in a similar position, such as Montgomerie Hamilton and Alfred Backhouse.

Notes

References

 
District Court of New South Wales
New South Wales-related lists